Chaker Zouaghi (born 10 January 1985) is a Tunisian professional football coach and a former defensive midfielder. He is a brother of Kaies Zouaghi, and was assistant manager under him as AS Gabès.

Club career
Zouaghi was born in Béja. He began his career at Étoile du Sahel before moving to FC Lokomotiv Moscow in the summer of 2006. He played in Moscow for three years, before having his contract mutually terminated in March 2009. In January 2010, Zouaghi signed a three-year contract with FC Zürich, to begin in July 2010.

In January 2014 Zouaghi was linked with a move to Iraqi Premier League side Duhok SC,

In December 2014, Zouaghi signed for FC Bunyodkor. On 1 August 2016, Zouaghi moved to UAE Division 1 side Al Khaleej.

International career
Zouaghi made his debut for Tunisia in November 2005.

Career statistics

Club

International

Honours
Étoile du Sahel
Coupe de la Ligue Professionelle: 2005
African Cup Winners' Cup: 2003

Lokomotiv Moscow
Russian Cup: 2007

References

External links
 FC Lokomotiv Moscow profile 
 
 Chaker Zouaghi at Footballdatabase

1985 births
Living people
People from Béja
Tunisian footballers
Association football defenders
Association football midfielders
Tunisia international footballers
2008 Africa Cup of Nations players
Swiss Super League players
Russian Premier League players
Olympique Béja players
Étoile Sportive du Sahel players
FC Zürich players
FC Lokomotiv Moscow players
Espérance Sportive de Tunis players
FC Bunyodkor players
UAE First Division League players
Khor Fakkan Sports Club players
Tunisian expatriate footballers
Tunisian expatriate sportspeople in Russia
Expatriate footballers in Russia
Tunisian expatriate sportspeople in Switzerland
Expatriate footballers in Switzerland
Tunisian expatriate sportspeople in Uzbekistan
Expatriate footballers in Uzbekistan
Tunisian expatriate sportspeople in the United Arab Emirates
Expatriate footballers in the United Arab Emirates
Tunisian football managers
Étoile Sportive du Sahel managers